The Prix Iris for Best Sound is an annual film award presented by Québec Cinéma as part of the Prix Iris awards program, to honour the year's best sound in feature films made within the Cinema of Quebec. Unlike some film awards, Québec Cinéma does not present separate awards for overall sound and sound editing, but instead honours the full sound team in a single category; however it does also present a distinct category for Best Sound in a Documentary.

Until 2016, it was known as the Jutra Award for Best Sound in memory of influential Quebec film director Claude Jutra. Following the withdrawal of Jutra's name from the award, the 2016 award was presented under the name Québec Cinéma. The Prix Iris name was announced in October 2016.

1990s

2000s

2010s

2020s

See also
Canadian Screen Award for Best Overall Sound
Canadian Screen Award for Best Sound Editing

References

Awards established in 1999
Film sound awards
Sound
Quebec-related lists
1999 establishments in Canada